Penrose Hill is a hamlet near Porthleven, Cornwall, England, UK.

References

Hamlets in Cornwall